Shamil Kamil (born 1 July 1947) is a former Iraqi football forward who played for Iraq in the 1972 AFC Asian Cup.

Kamil played for the national team between 1971 and 1973.

Career statistics

International goals
Scores and results list Iraq's goal tally first.

References

Iraqi footballers
Iraq international footballers
Living people
Association football forwards
1947 births
1972 AFC Asian Cup players